The Maybach VL I was an Otto cycle V-12 engine, made from 1924 in Germany. The airship LZ 126 was powered by five VL I engines which emphasised reliability and low fuel consumption.

Technical description 

The crankshaft was supported in roller-bearings and was fitted with a vibration damper for smooth operation. The overhead valves, one large inlet valve and two smaller outlet valves per cylinder, were operated by a camshaft running between the cylinder banks, operating the valves with tappets, pushrods and rocker arms.

The majority of the ancillary equipment was run by the camshaft to reduce vibration. Fuel was mixed with air by two fireproof Maybach carburetors per cylinder bank, with two header tanks above the carburetors providing fuel.

To change the direction of rotation of the crankshaft, the camshaft, with lobes for normal or reverse operation, could be moved by compressed air to change over the cams in use. This mechanism, used to decelerate and halt aircraft, was operated by an engineer, accommodated in the engine nacelles, with levers.

Specifications

References 

Maybach engines
Airship engines
1920s aircraft piston engines
V12 aircraft engines